Brandon Moore (born 27 July 1996) is an English professional rugby league footballer who plays as a  for Halifax in the Betfred Championship.

Background
Moore was born in Cumbria, England.

Career
Moore joined Halifax in 2016. In September 2020, he joined Huddersfield Giants on loan until the end of the season.

References

External links
Halifax profile

1996 births
Living people
English rugby league players
Rugby league hookers
Rugby league players from Cumbria
Halifax R.L.F.C. captains
Halifax R.L.F.C. players
Huddersfield Giants players